Microsoft Interactive Media Manager (IMM) was a collaborative media management system that leveraged Microsoft Office SharePoint Server 2007 for a web-based workflow, including both in-browser management and playback UI. It also included a RDF and OWL based metadata framework to set up relationships between media assets and facilitate tracking and complex searches. It was discontinued in 2009.

References

Interactive Media Manager
Multimedia
Collaboration
Groupware